The Riley RM Series is an executive car which was produced by Riley from 1945 until 1955. It was the last model developed independently by Riley prior to the 1952 merger of Riley's still new owner Nuffield, with Austin to form BMC. The RM series was originally produced in Coventry, but in 1949 production moved to the MG works at Abingdon. The RM models were marketed as the Riley 1½ Litre and the Riley 2½ Litre.

There were four types of RM vehicles produced. All used Riley engines with four cylinders in-line, hemispherical combustion chambers and twin camshafts mounted high at the sides of the cylinder block.

The RMA was a large saloon, and was replaced by the RME. Both used a 1.5 L (1496 cc) 12 hp (RAC Rating), developed before WWII.

The RMB was a longer car: it was replaced by the RMF. Both cars used a larger engine, new in 1937, a 2.5 L 16 hp (RAC Rating) "Big Four".

The RMC and RMD were limited-production cars, an open 2 or 3-seater Roadster and a 4-seater Drophead. 

The Riley Pathfinder was the RMH and the last saloon to have the Riley Big Four engine.


Kestrel

The RM was inspired by Riley Motors' successful and stylish pre-war 1.5 and 2.5 Litre Kestrel Saloons but the new cars featured a new chassis. The new chassis with its Riley "torsionic" independent front-wheel suspension incorporated the experience of the wartime years.

The RM series was new because the patterns of dies for the old models were destroyed in the air raids on Coventry.

Riley RMA

The RMA was the first post-war Riley. It was announced in August 1945 with the news it would become available in the autumn. It used the 1.5 L engine and was equipped with hydro-mechanical brakes and an independent suspension using torsion bars in front. The body frame (not to be confused with the chassis) was made of wood in the English tradition, and the car featured traditional styling. The car was capable of reaching . The RMA was produced from 1945 until 1952 when it was replaced by the RME.

Riley RMB

The 2.5 L (2443 cc) RMB was a lengthened RMA launched a year later in 1946.

It used the 2.5 L (2443 cc) "Big Four" engine with twin SU carburettors, starting with 90 hp (67 kW) but increasing to 100 hp (75 kW) for 1948 with a  top speed.

The wheelbase was  longer and the overall length was a full  longer. The RMB was replaced by the RMF for 1952.

The RMB 2½ Litre models have light blue bonnet and bootlid badges, differentiating them from the RMA 1½ Litre models which have dark blue  badges.

The test car cost £1224 including taxes.

Riley RMC 

The RMC (Roadster) was an open 2-door, single bench seat, 2/3-seater version of the RMB, with a large rear deck area and fold-flat windscreen. Announced in March 1948, it was delivered to Geneva just too late to be exhibited at the Geneva Motor Show. Primarily designed for the North American export market, it was normally built with left-hand drive, with the gear change lever on the steering column. The bonnet and radiator were lowered and the bonnet catches were arranged to be operated internally.

Eighteen months later, in September 1949, Riley announced future production would include a small quota of cars with right-hand drive. Riley attributed that to a slight increase in the supply of steel.

Instead of side windows it was supplied with flexible celluloid-glazed side curtains with a hole for hand signals and, when deployed, flimsy synthetic roofing over a light metal frame. It shared that car's 2.5 L  engine, and could reach .

Just over 500 were built from 1948 until 1951.

Both the back and front of the car bore a remarkable likeness to a 1934 Ford V8.

Riley RMD

The RMD (drophead) was a traditional 2-door cabriolet, the last cabriolet to wear the Riley name.  It used the same 2.5 L 100 hp (75 kW) engine as the RMB, on which it was based.  Just over 500 were produced between 1949 and 1951.

This new body was first displayed in October 1948 at London's Earls Court Motor Show.

Riley RME

Released in 1952, the RME was an improved RMA.  It still used the 1.5 L four and featured a fully hydraulic braking system. The body had an enlarged rear window with curved glass. To improve acceleration the rear axle ratio was changed from 4.89:1 to 5.125:1.

When the 2.5 L (2443 cc) car ended production in October 1953 a switch to no running boards was amongst many updates to the RME including wholly new shaped front mudguards.

Produced from 1952, it was discontinued in 1955 and ultimately its place in the range went in 1957 to the much shorter and unrelated, intended but unused, replacement for the Morris Minor — Riley One-Point-Five also sold as Wolseley 1500, Morris Major and the Austin Lancer.

The test car cost £1,339 including taxes.

Riley RMF

The RMF replaced the RMB in 1952.  It shared that car's 2.5 L "Big Four" engine as well as the mechanical updates from the RME.  The RMH Riley Pathfinder, the last automobile to use the Riley "Big Four" engine, and thus considered to be the last "real" Riley by purists, took its place after 1953 and continued in production until 1957.

The RMF 2½ Litre models have light blue bonnet and bootlid badges, differentiating them from the RME 1½ Litre models which have dark blue  badges.

Riley 2½-litre Big Four engine
The Big Four engine is a four cylinder 2.5 litre engine rated at 16.07 h.p. under the British RAC formula. It was designed in a matter of months, under difficult financial conditions, and announced in the summer of 1937. It followed existing Riley practice, similar to their 1.5 litre engine, but with each cylinder completely surrounded by a water jacket. The fully counter-weighted and balanced crankshaft ran in three main bearings. In its final Riley Pathfinder form, it developed  and was produced until the end of Riley Pathfinder production in February 1957.

Bibliography
A-Z of Cars 1945–1970. Michael Sedgwick and Mark Gillies. Bayview Books. 1989. 
Book by James Taylor - RILEY RM-SERIES - 
Book by John Price Williams - The Legendary RMs - 
Ramsey, John. The Swapmeet and Toyfair Catalogue of British Diecast Model Toys. Swapmeet Toys and Models Ltd. p. 29.

References

RM
1950s cars
Rear-wheel-drive vehicles
Luxury vehicles
Executive cars
Sedans
Convertibles
Cars introduced in 1945